Josiah Brown Pearson (1841 – 10 March 1895) was the Anglican Bishop of Newcastle in New South Wales from 1880 until 1889.

Born in 1841 in Chesterfield, Derbyshire, he was educated at Chesterfield Grammar School and St John's College, Cambridge. Ordained deacon in 1865 and priest in 1866 he held curacies in Cambridge as well as being a Fellow at St John's (1865-80). He lectured in moral science at St John's (1865-71) and was Hulsean lecturer in 1872. He held incumbencies at Horningsea (1871-74) and Newark (1874-80). In 1880 he became Bishop of Newcastle (Australia). Pearson struggled with the frontier-like nature of Australian dioceses, and when James Moorhouse was translated from Melbourne to Manchester in 1886, Pearson was offered and accepted an incumbency and assistant bishopric within the then vast diocese of Manchester. Pearson's mental health collapsed, and it was not until 1889 that he was able to complete his resignation as Bishop of Newcastle. By 1893 he was sufficiently recovered to became Vicar of St Peter's Church, Leck Lancashire. 

His recovery was short-lived, and he died in 1895. He is buried in the churchyard at Leck.

References

Further reading
 

1841 births
People educated at Chesterfield Grammar School
Alumni of St John's College, Cambridge
Fellows of St John's College, Oxford
Anglican bishops of Newcastle (Australia)
1895 deaths